Theodore Tobias Mappus Jr. (July 20, 1926 – February 11, 2022) was an American politician.

Mappus was born in Charleston, South Carolina, and graduated from Charleston High School. He went to Newberry College and graduated from Duke University in 1946. He served in the United States Navy during World War II and the Korean War and was conmmissioned a lieutenant. Mappus was involved with the insurance business. He served in the South Carolina House of Representatives from 1987 to 1991 and was a Republican. He died on February 11, 2022, in Charleston, South Carolina, at the age of 95.

References

1926 births
2022 deaths
Businesspeople from Charleston, South Carolina
Politicians from Charleston, South Carolina
Military personnel from Charleston, South Carolina
Newberry College alumni
Duke University alumni
Republican Party members of the South Carolina House of Representatives